Andretti Harding Steinbrenner Autosport was an auto racing team that competed in the IndyCar Series. Founded as Harding Racing in 2017 by businessman Mike Harding, the team would form partnerships in 2019 with Steinbrenner Racing and in 2020 with Andretti Autosport, the latter resulting in team equipment and personnel moving into Andretti's race shop. Harding's involvement would end after the 2020 season.

History
The team was founded as Harding Racing in 2017 by Mike Harding, with Gabby Chaves as driver for the Indy 500, Texas and Pocono, moving to full-time in 2018. In 2019, he would partner with Steinbrenner Racing, led by George Michael Steinbrenner IV, the son of the late New York Yankees co-owner and co-chairman Hank Steinbrenner and a grandson of George Steinbrenner III. Steinbrenner IV had previously run an Indy Lights program with childhood friend Colton Herta as driver, in a partnership with Andretti Autosport. With the addition of Steinbrenner IV came Herta and a technical alliance with Andretti, that would see Andretti Technologies engineers be assigned to the No. 88. A planned second entry was intended for Herta's Lights teammate and rival Pato O'Ward, however due to a lack of funding (despite O'Ward carrying a 3-race scholarship for winning the Lights championship), the No. 8 Honda that O'Ward was slated to drive was never entered, and O'Ward would be released from his contract before the first race of 2019.

Herta would win the second race of 2019, at Circuit of the Americas, but that did little to solve the team's continued budget issues. Herta had a contract with Andretti which superseded his contract with Harding, but with the requirement that Herta have a IndyCar Series race ride. Rather than lose the young driver to the newly formed Arrow McLaren SP, Andretti agreed to a deal that would see the HSR No. 88 entry absorbed into Andretti's shop after the 2019 season, with team equipment and some personnel being moved under the Andretti banner, but not before Herta would win again in the season finale at Laguna Seca.

Larry Curry acted as the team manager and competition director. In November 2017 Brian Barnhart was named the team's president as the team prepared to join the series full time. Barnhart would be credited with securing the partnership with Steinbrenner/Andretti and eventual merger with Andretti amidst the teams budget issues.

At 22-years old, Steinbrenner became the youngest car owner in IndyCar history.

Racing results

Complete IndyCar Series results
(key)

* Season still in progress

IndyCar wins

References

IndyCar Series teams
American auto racing teams
Auto racing teams established in 2017
Auto racing teams disestablished in 2020